Eupraxia of Ryazan (died 1237), was a Princess consort of Ryazan by marriage to Prince Fyodor Yurevich of Ryazan. She was venerated as a local saint in the Russian Orthodox church. She committed suicide rather than to surrender to captivity of Batu Khan during the Mongol invasion of Russia. She has been portrayed in films.

References

  Евпраксия, жена князя Федора Юрьевича // Энциклопедический словарь Брокгауза и Ефрона : в 86 т. (82 т. и 4 доп.). — СПб., 1890—1907.

1237 deaths
13th-century Russian people